Smoluchowski is a lunar impact crater on the far side of the Moon. It lies in the part of the lunar surface that is sometimes brought into view of the Earth during periods of favorable libration and illumination from sunlight, but at such times little detail can be seen as the crater is observed from the edge. Smoluchowski lies across the northern rim of the larger walled plain Poczobutt. Nearly attached to the north-northeastern outer rim of Smoluchowski is the smaller crater Paneth.

This is a worn and eroded crater formation that has still managed to retain much of its original shape. The remains of a small crater lie across the southern floor and inner wall of Smoluchowski, protruding outwards slightly into Poczobutt. A smaller crater lies along the inner wall of the southwestern rim, and a small craterlet lies across the north-northwestern rim edge. Along the surface connecting Smoluchowski with Paneth is an elongated depression in the surface that overlies the rim edge and inner wall of Smoluchowski. There is also a narrow groove in the surface near that site running from east to west.

Apart from the small crater rim in the southern floor, the interior surface of Smoluchowski is relatively level and featureless. A few small and tiny craterlets mark the floor, the most notable being a small craterlet along the eastern edge.

Satellite craters
By convention these features are identified on lunar maps by placing the letter on the side of the crater midpoint that is closest to Smoluchowski.

Smoluchowski H, to the southeast of Smoluchowski, is a relatively fresh crater, possibly of Eratosthenian age.

References

 
 
 
 
 
 
 
 
 
 
 
 

Impact craters on the Moon